The Armenian Union of Architects is founded in 1932 in Yerevan by the committee under the chairmanship of Gevorg Kochar. The members of committee were Mikayel Mazmanian (Deputy Chairman of the Committee), N. Buniatyan, Alexander Tamanyan, A. Aharonian, F. Hakobyan, B. Arazyan, A. Margaryan, M. Mkrtchyan. 

The members of the Union have a huge contribution to the construction of towns, villages and unique engineered systems in Armenia. 

Currently the Union of Architects of Armenia has 643 members. The president is Mkrtich Minasyan.

References

External links
 
 Official website

Business organizations based in Armenia
1932 establishments in Armenia